Paks is a district in north-eastern part of Tolna County. Paks is also the name of the town where the district seat is found. The district is located in the Southern Transdanubia Statistical Region.

Geography 
Paks District borders with Sárbogárd District and Dunaújváros District (Fejér County) to the north, Kunszentmiklós District and Kalocsa District (Bács-Kiskun County) to the east, Tolna District and Szekszárd District to the south, Tamási District to the west. The number of the inhabited places in Paks District is 15.

Municipalities 
The district has 2 towns, 1 large village and 12 villages.
(ordered by population, as of 1 January 2013)

The bolded municipalities are cities, italics municipality is large village.

See also
List of cities and towns in Hungary

References

External links
 Postal codes of the Paks District

Districts in Tolna County